Chattakaari (English: The Anglo Indian Girl) is a 2012 Indian Malayalam-language romantic drama film written by Thoppil Bhasi based on Pamman's famous novel of the same name and directed by Santosh Sethumadhavan. It is the remake of the 1974 film of the same name, directed by K. S. Sethumadhavan, the father of Santhosh.  The film was produced by G. Suresh Kumar under the banner of Revathy Kalamandhir. It stars Shamna Kasim in the title roles.

Plot
Julie is the eldest daughter of Morris, an Anglo-Indian engine-driver. Usha her close friend is from an orthodox Hindu Warrier family. At Usha's residence she (Julie) meets her brother Sasi who is studying at a different place. Julie soon falls in love with Sasi. The relationship gets more cozy and Julie gets pregnant. The rest of the plot revolves around the struggles of Julie and her baby boy, against the hypocritic fangs of society.
The plot addresses themes like Life of Anglo-Indians in Kerala, the alarming rise in Premarital Pregnancy and the taboo associated with Inter caste Love and Marriage, all of which were hot topics of discussion when the movie released in 1974. According to the producer Suresh Kumar, the relevance of the remake lies in the present day Kerala society, which is still no different from the then society, with respect to these social aspects.

Casting

Being a heroine oriented film, the role of Julie was first to be fixed. Many mainstream Malayalam actresses were considered, and the team zeroed in on Shamna Kasim. Hemanth Menon, who has previously acted in some Malayalam movies was fixed as the male lead. Innocent plays the character of Morris, which was handled by the thespian of Malayalam cinema, Adoor Bhasi. Sukumari is the only actress present in both the versions of the movie. The support cast include Suvarna and Malu Raveendranath, portraying the characters of Julie's mother and sister respectively.

Filming
The film was shot predominantly at Ooty, with some scenes being shot at Udhagamandalam railway station, and hill stations in Thiruvananthapuram. The filming completed in a record 25 days. A song was shot at Thommankuthu Waterfall, near Thodupuzha amidst heavy rain.

Soundtrack

The film features a soundtrack composed by M. Jayachandran with lyrics penned by Murukan Kattakada, Rajeev Alunkal, Charu Hariharan. The music for the film was released on 2 June 2012 by Honorable Minister for Film Development K. B. Ganesh Kumar at Kanakakkunnu Palace . The behind the scenes videos of the songs "Nilave Nilave"  and "Oh My Julie" were released online in YouTube.

Track listing

References

External links
 ‘Chattakkari’ is already a hit!
 

2012 films
2010s Malayalam-language films
Films shot in Ooty
Remakes of Indian films
Indian romantic drama films
Films scored by M. Jayachandran
2012 romantic drama films
Films shot in Kerala
Films shot in Thiruvananthapuram
Films shot in Munnar
Indian pregnancy films